was a railway station on the Sankō Line in Miyoshi, Hiroshima Prefecture, Japan, operated by West Japan Railway Company (JR West). Opened in 1969, The station closed on 31 March 2018 with the closure of the entire Sanko Line.

Lines

Adjacent stations

History
The station opened on 25 April 1969. With the privatization of Japanese National Railways (JNR) on 1 April 1987, the station came under the control of JR West.

On 16 October 2015, JR West announced that it was considering closing the Sanko Line due to poor patronage. On 29 September 2016, JR West announced that the entire line would close on 31 March 2018. The line then closed on 31 March 2018, with an event hosted by JR West.

See also
 List of railway stations in Japan

References

External links

  

Railway stations in Japan opened in 1969
Railway stations in Hiroshima Prefecture
Sankō Line
Stations of West Japan Railway Company
Railway stations closed in 2018